Rita Izsák-Ndiaye is an independent senior human rights expert and former Hungarian diplomat. She has worked on human, minority and youth rights in various NGOs, the Hungarian Government and with international organizations. She served as the United Nations Special Rapporteur on minority issues between 2011 and 2017, as well as member and Rapporteur of the UN Committee on the Elimination of Racial Discrimination between 2018-2022. In 2021 and 2022, she was the Personal Representative of the OSCE Chairperson-in-Office on Children and Security. As of autoumn 2022, she is Senior Adviser on Anti-Racisam at UNDP.

Early life and career 
Rita's mother is of Romani origin and her father's family was forcibly transferred in 1947 from Czechoslovakia, currently Slovakia, to Hungary under population transfers after World War II because of their Hungarian ethnicity. Since her university years, Rita worked on minority and human rights inspired by her family's and her own experiences with discrimination. She obtained a law master's degree at the Pázmány Péter Catholic University in Budapest, Hungary.

Rita started her international career at the European Roma Rights Center in Hungary, then she became a Consultant of the UN Office of the High Commissioner for Human Rights in Geneva. Later, Rita worked in Hargeisa, Somalia, as a youth rights advisor and in Srebrenica, Bosnia and Herzegovina, as a human rights officer with OSCE. In 2010, she became Chief of Staff of the Social Inclusion Secretariat of the Hungarian Ministry of Justice and Public Administration and she coordinated the successful adoption of the EU Framework for National Roma Integration Strategies. She was also the first CEO and President of the Tom Lantos Institute. 

She assumed the role as the United Nations Special Rapporteur on Minority Issues on 1 August 2011 after being appointed by the UN Human Rights Council, a position in which she was renewed in 2014 and that she held until 31 July 2017. During her tenure, Rita guided the work of the UN Forum on Minority Issues, prepared annual thematic and country reports to the UN Human Rights Council and General Assembly (including on criminal justice systems, Sustainable Development Goals, mass atrocity prevention, hate speech, the rights of religious and linguistic minorities, etc). She carried out official missions to Bosnia and Herzegovina, Cameroon, Nigeria, Brazil, Ukraine, the Republic of Moldova, and Iraq. She urged for the protection of minorities in Iraq, Colombia, Sri Lanka, and Cameroon, as well as of homosexuals in Moldavia. At the 27th Meeting of States parties to the International Convention on the Elimination of All Forms of Racial Discrimination (ICERD) in 2017, she was elected to become a member of the United Nations Committee on the Elimination of Racial Discrimination (CERD), as position that she assumed on 20 January 2018 with a term of four years.

Izsák-Ndiaye has also served as senior human rights consultant for the UN Secretary-General's Envoy on Youth office in 2020 and 2021, personal representative on Children and Security of the Organization for Security and Co-operation in Europe, . She is an advisory board member at the Global Centre for the Responsibility to Protect, KONA Connect, and the Women Leadership Council of the International Coalition of the Sites of Conscience.

Personal life 
Rita is also a Senegalese citizen. She speaks Hungarian, English, French and German.

References

External links 

 Expert Voices on Atrocity Prevention Episode 1: Rita Izsák-Ndiaye - 22 January 2021, Global Centre for the Responsibility to Protect
 Rights experts urge UN to compensate displaced Roma poisoned in camps in Kosovo - 15 April 2016, UN News

People of Hungarian-Romani descent
Hungarian women diplomats
21st-century Hungarian lawyers
Pázmány Péter Catholic University alumni
Living people
Year of birth missing (living people)